The International Code of Conduct against Ballistic Missile Proliferation, also known as the Hague Code of Conduct (HCOC), was established on 25 November 2002 as an arrangement to prevent the proliferation of ballistic missiles.

The HCOC is the result of international efforts to regulate access to ballistic missiles which can potentially deliver weapons of mass destruction. The HCOC is the only multilateral code in the area of disarmament which has been adopted over the last years.  It is the only normative instrument to verify the spread of ballistic missiles. The HCOC does not ban ballistic missiles, but it does call for restraint in their production, testing, and export.

As agreed by the conference in The Hague, Austria serves as the Immediate Central Contact (Executive Secretariat) and therefore coordinates the information exchange of the HCOC. 

To create a link between the UN and the HCOC, which was not negotiated in the context of the UN, a Resolution regarding the HCOC was tabled in the course of the 59th as well as the 60th and 63rd sessions of the General Assembly in New York City.

Since the HCOC's entry into force, sixteen Conferences of Subscribing States of the HCOC have been held. The 16th Regular Meeting of Subscribing States of the HCOC took place from 6–7 June 2017 under the chairmanship of Ambassador Marek Szczygieł from Poland.

India joined the HCOC on 1 June 2016.

While the Missile Technology Control Regime (MTCR) has a similar mission, it is an export group with only 35 members.

Membership 
Since the signing and entering into force of the HCOC Code in November 2002 in The Hague, (Netherlands) the number of signatories has increased from 96 to 138 (136 UN members, the Cook Islands and the Holy See). India, which joined on 1 June 2016, is the latest signatory of the HCOC.

The 57 non-signatory UN states are:

 Algeria
 Angola
 Bahamas
 Bahrain
 Bangladesh
 Barbados
 Belize
 Bhutan
 Bolivia
 Botswana
 Brazil
 China
 Cuba
 Djibouti
 Egypt
 Equatorial Guinea
 Grenada
 Indonesia
 Iran
 Israel
 Ivory Coast
 Jamaica
 Kuwait
 Kyrgyzstan
 Laos
 Lebanon
 Lesotho
 Malaysia
 Mauritius
 Mexico
 Myanmar
 Namibia
 Nauru
 Nepal
 Niue
 North Korea
 Oman
 Pakistan
 Qatar
 Saint Lucia
 Saint Vincent and the Grenadines
 São Tomé and Príncipe
 Saudi Arabia
 Solomon Islands
 Somalia
 South Sudan
 Sri Lanka
 Syria
 Swaziland
 Thailand
 Togo
 Trinidad and Tobago
 United Arab Emirates
 Vietnam
 Yemen
 Zimbabwe

No states with limited recognition have signed this code.

References

External links 
 Treaty text
 Central Contact (Executive Secretariat)

Arms control